Bystřec is a municipality and village in Ústí nad Orlicí District in the Pardubice Region of the Czech Republic. It has about 1,100 inhabitants.

History
The first written mention of Bystřec is from 1304. It was founded on the crossroads of two old trade routes.

References

External links

Villages in Ústí nad Orlicí District